Work study or Work Study may refer to:
 Diligent Work-Frugal Study Movement also known as Work-Study Movement, a program to bring Chinese students into France and Belgium in the early 20th century
 Cooperative education
 Federal Work-Study Program in the United States
 Internship
 Job analysis
 Time and motion study
 International Journal of Productivity and Performance Management